Dabhoi is one of the 182 Legislative Assembly constituencies of Gujarat state in India. It is part of Vadodara district.

List of segments
This assembly seat represents the following segments:

 Dabhoi Taluka
 Vadodara Taluka (Part) Villages – Ankhol, Khatamba, Bhayli, Raypura, Gokalpura, Samiyala, Bil, Timbi, Dangiwada, Pansoli, Shankarpura, Jobantekri, Ratanpur, Vadadla, Talsat, Chapad, Maretha, Chikhodara, Alhadpura, Navapura, Tatarpura, Sultanpura, Diwalipura, Hetampura, Kelanpur, Dhaniyavi, Vora Gamdi, Mujar Gamdi, Alamgir, Khalipur, Varnama, Sundarpura, Shahpura, Hansajipura, Raghavpura, Samaspura, Patarveni, Rabhipura, Fatepura, Kajapur, Hansapura, Mastupur Gamdi, Kandkoi, Meghakui, Salad, Ajitpura, Dolatpura, Ramnath, Rasulpur, Runvad, Samsabad
 Vadodara Taluka (Part) - Vadodara Municipal Corporation (Part) Ward No. – Kalali (OG) 18

Members of Legislative Assembly
1998 - Siddharth Patel, Indian National Congress
2002 - Prof. Chandrakant Motibhai Patel, Bharatiya Janata Party
2007 - Siddharth Patel, Indian National Congress
2012 - Balkrushnabhai Patel, Bharatiya Janata Party

Election results

2022

2017

2012

2002

See also
 List of constituencies of the Gujarat Legislative Assembly
 Vadodara district
 Gujarat Legislative Assembly

References

External links
 

Assembly constituencies of Gujarat
Vadodara district